Thomas Gérard Idir (born 26 June 1980), better known by his stage name Sinik, is a French-language rap artist. He is also known as Malsain, L'assassin and S.I.N.I.K.. His father is Algerian while his mother is French. In 2001, he founded his label Six o Nine (6-0-9).

Collaborations / Feuds

His meeting with Diam's at 14 was the turning point of his career. They consider themselves as brother and sister.

Le Toit du Monde, released in 2007, contains a song called "Je réalise" which features British singer songwriter, James Blunt. The single is bilingual, with English parts performed by Blunt and French parts by Sinik.

He is also notorious for a number of feuds with other rap artists, most notably Kizito, Booba and Gaiden

Discography

Albums

Street albums

Other releases
Mixtapes
1999: Ul'Team At Home 1er Volet (Mixtape Ul'Team Atom)
2011: Immortel (Best of de Sinik )
Maxis'''
2000: Malsain 
2002: Artiste triste''

Singles

See also 
 Oxaï Roura
 Willy Denzey
 Sidney Duteil
 Abd al Malik (rapper)

References

External links 
 Sinik 609
 Sinik – AOL Music

1980 births
Living people
French rappers
French hip hop musicians
French people of Algerian descent
French people of Kabyle descent